Snegurochka or  Snow Maiden, is a character in Russian fairy tales.

Snegurochka may also refer to:

Snow Maiden (disambiguation)
The Snow Maiden (disambiguation)
The Daughter of the Snows a ballet based on a piece about Snegurochka
,  manga by Hiroaki Samura
Snegurochka Planitia, plain around the Renpet Mons volcano on Venus
Sneguročka, a ballad fairy tale by Svetlana Makarovič